Events in the year 1973 in Mexico.

Incumbents

Federal government
 President: Luis Echeverría
 Interior Secretary (SEGOB): Mario Moya Palencia
 Secretary of Foreign Affairs (SRE): Emilio Óscar Rabasa
 Communications Secretary (SCT): Eugenio Méndez Docurro
 Education Secretary (SEP): Víctor Bravo Ahuja
 Secretary of Defense (SEDENA): Matías Ramos
 Secretary of Navy: Luis M. Bravo Carrera
 Secretary of Labor and Social Welfare: Porfirio Muñoz Ledo
 Secretary of Welfare: Luis Enrique Bracamontes

Supreme Court

 President of the Supreme Court: Alfonso Guzmán Neyra

Governors

 Aguascalientes: Francisco Guel Jiménez
 Baja California: Milton Castellanos Everardo
 Campeche: Carlos Sansores Pérez/Carlos Pérez Cámara/Rafael Rodríguez Barrera
 Chiapas: Manuel Velasco Suárez
 Chihuahua: Oscar Flores Sánchez
 Coahuila: Eulalio Gutiérrez Treviño
 Colima: Pablo Silva García/Leonel Ramírez García
 Durango: Alejandro Páez Urquidi
 Guanajuato: Manuel M. Moreno/Luis H. Ducoing Gamba
 Guerrero: Israel Nogueda Otero
 Hidalgo: Manuel Sánchez Vite
 Jalisco: Alberto Orozco Romero
 State of Mexico: Carlos Hank González 
 Michoacán: Servando Chávez Hernández
 Morelos: Felipe Rivera Crespo (PRI)
 Nayarit: Roberto Gómez Reyes
 Nuevo León: Luis M. Farías
 Oaxaca: Fernando Gómez Sandoval
 Puebla: Rafael Moreno Valle/Mario Mellado García/Gonzalo Bautista O'Farril/Guillermo Morales Blumenkron
 Querétaro: Juventino Castro Sánchez/Antonio Calzada Urquiza
 San Luis Potosí: Antonio Rocha Cordero/Guillermo Fonseca Álvarez
 Sinaloa: Alfredo Valdés Montoya
 Sonora: Faustino Félix Serna/Carlos Armando Biebrich Torres
 Tabasco: Mario Trujillo García
 Tamaulipas: Manuel A. Rabize	
 Tlaxcala: Luciano Huerta Sánchez
 Veracruz: Rafael Hernández Ochoa
 Yucatán: Carlos Loret de Mola Mediz
 Zacatecas: Pedro Ruiz González
Regent of Mexico City: Octavio Senties Gomez

Events

 January 30: The 7.5  Colima earthquake causes 56 deaths, 390 injuries, and a non-destructive tsunami in Mexico.
 June 16: The Brothers Serdán Baseball stadium opens. 
 June 19: Autonomous University of Aguascalientes  established. 
 June 20: Aeroméxico Flight 229.
 July 1: 1973 Mexican legislative election. 
 August 28: 1973 Veracruz earthquake.

Awards
Belisario Domínguez Medal of Honor – Pablo E. Macías Valenzuela

Film

 List of Mexican films of 1973.

Sport

 1972–73 Mexican Primera División season. 
 Diablos Rojos del México win the Mexican League.
 Lobos de Tlaxcala founded.
 Club Deportivo Tapatío is founded when CD Guadalajara buy a Tercera División license.

Births
 January 17 — Cuauhtémoc Blanco, Mexican soccer player and politician, Governor of Morelos 2018-2024
 February 1 – Óscar Pérez Rojas, football goalkeeper
 February 3 – Ilana Sod, journalist
February 22 – Mr. Niebla, (Efrén Tiburcio Márquez), wrestler; (d. December 23, 2019).
May 20 — Patricia Navidad, actress and singer
June 5 — Galilea Montijo, actress, comedienne, model, and TV presenter
June 20 — Enrique Alfaro Ramírez, Governor of Jalisco 2018–2024
June 22 — Jaime Camil, singer and actor
August 16 — Mauricio Islas, actor
September 19
Javier Duarte de Ochoa, politician (formerly PRI); Governor of Veracruz 2010-2016, arrested for alleged corruption April 15, 2016
 David Zepeda, actor, model, and singer
December 17 — Martha Érika Alonso, Governor of Puebla 2018 (d. 2018)

Deaths
 December 3 – Adolfo Ruiz Cortines, 47th President of Mexico, 1952-1958 (b. 1890)

References

External links

 
Mexico